The 1989–90 season ended for First Vienna FC with an eighth-place finish in the domestic league. During this season the club played for their second time in a European competition when they have been eliminated in the second round of the 1989–90 UEFA Cup.

Squad

Squad and statistics

|-
! colspan="12" style="background:#dcdcdc; text-align:center;"| Goalkeepers

|-
! colspan="12" style="background:#dcdcdc; text-align:center;"| Defenders

|-
! colspan="12" style="background:#dcdcdc; text-align:center;"| Midfielders

|-
! colspan="12" style="background:#dcdcdc; text-align:center;"| Forwards

|}

References

Vienna
First Vienna FC seasons